Tupelo Regional Airport  is a public use airport located  west of the central business district of Tupelo, a city in Lee County, Mississippi, United States. It is owned by the Tupelo Airport Authority. The airport is mostly used for general aviation, but is also served by one commercial airline with scheduled passenger service subsidized by the federal Essential Air Service (EAS) program. Many college football teams visiting the University of Mississippi (Ole Miss), 49 miles west in Oxford, fly into Tupelo.

As per the Federal Aviation Administration, this airport had 15,985 passenger boardings (enplanements) in calendar year 2008, 13,319 in 2009, and 12,749 in 2010. The National Plan of Integrated Airport Systems for 2011–2015 categorized it as a primary commercial service airport.

Facilities and aircraft 

For the 12-month period ending December 31, 2011, the airport had 50,916 aircraft operations, an average of 139 per day: 56% general aviation, 38% military, 6% air taxi, and <1% scheduled commercial. At that time there were 68 aircraft based at this airport: 35% single-engine, 22% multi-engine, 9% jet, 3% helicopter, and 31% military.

An additional primary function of the airport is to serve as an aircraft boneyard, including scrapping, parts recycling and aircraft storage. Universal Asset Management, an aviation company, has dismantled large, wide body jetliners at the airport including Airbus A330, Airbus A340, Boeing 747-400 and Boeing 777 aircraft for recycling.

Historical air service 

Southern Airways was serving the airport in 1952 with Douglas DC-3 aircraft with three daily round trip flights operating a routing of Atlanta - Gadsden, AL - Birmingham, AL - Tuscaloosa, AL - Columbus, MS - Tupelo - Memphis for a total of six departures a day from the airport.
By 1968, Southern Airways was operating nonstop flights to Columbus, MS, Memphis, and Tuscaloosa as well as direct flights to Atlanta and Birmingham, AL with all of their Tupelo service being operated with Martin 4-0-4 piston airliners. Southern continued to serve the airport during most of the 1970s with Martin 4-0-4 aircraft.  Southern then eventually merged with North Central Airlines to form Republic Airlines which in 1979 was serving Tupelo with small Swearingen Metroliner turboprops with nonstop flights from both Atlanta (ATL) and Memphis (MEM).  By 1981, Republic was operating larger Convair 580 turboprops  into the airport with nonstop service from Memphis and Muscle Shoals, AL.  However, Republic was no longer serving Tupelo by the summer of 1984.  By early 1985, Scheduled Skyways, a commuter airline, was operating nonstop service from Memphis and Meridian with Nord 262 and Swearingen Metroliner turboprops while Flight Line, also a commuter air carrier, was serving the airport at this same time with small Cessna aircraft.

In late 1989 when Memphis (MEM) was a Northwest hub following the acquisition of Republic Airlines by Northwest Airlines, Northwest Airlink operated British Aerospace BAe Jetstream 31 and Saab 340 turboprop service on a code sharing basis on behalf of Northwest to Tupelo nonstop from Memphis, Columbus, MS, and Laurel, MS/Hattiesburg, MS.  At this same time in 1989, American Eagle was operating flights on a code sharing basis on behalf of American Airlines with Swearingen Metroliner turboprops nonstop from both Nashville (BNA, an American hub at the time) and Tuscaloosa. Both American Eagle and Northwest Airlink were continuing to serve Tupelo in the spring of 1995 with American Eagle operating British Aerospace BAe Jetstream 31 turboprops nonstop from Nashville while Northwest Airlink was continuing to operate BAe Jetstream 31 and Saab 340 turboprops nonstop from Memphis, Columbus, MS, and Laurel, MS/Hattiesburg, MS.  Following the merger in 2008 between Northwest and Delta, all Northwest Airlink service was subsequently replaced with Delta Connection code sharing flights on behalf of Delta Air Lines. Delta Connection operated nonstop flights to both Memphis and Atlanta (ATL), with the Memphis service eventually being discontinued.  Delta Connection was serving Tupelo from ATL with Bombardier CRJ-200 regional jets by this time.

In 2012, after Delta Connection had ceased serving Tupelo, Silver Airways began service to Greenville, Muscle Shoals, and Atlanta using Saab 340s. Silver Airways then terminated service in October 2014 and was replaced by SeaPort Airlines.  SeaPort flew for one year, ceasing their service by the end of October 2015.  The airport was then without service for five months until April 2016 when Contour Airlines began flights with daily service to Nashville (BNA).  Since April 2016, Contour has upgraded their service several times including replacing their twin turboprop BAe Jetstream 31 aircraft with Embraer ERJ 135 regional jets.  Tupelo's annual enplanements have steadily grown and the airport has once again obtained Primary Airport status with the FAA in 2017, 2018 and 2019.

Current airline and destination

Scheduled passenger service 

Contour Airlines began daily nonstop flights in 2016 to Nashville using British Aerospace Jetstream 31 turboprop aircraft. On April 1, 2016, this service was upgraded with Embraer ERJ 135 regional jets being used for their scheduled passenger flights.

Cargo 
Tupelo has no scheduled cargo service but does receive various cargo charters from time to time, most notably with Embraer EMB-120 Brasilias operated by Berry Aviation as well as ATR 72s operated by FedEx.

U.S. Army National Guard aviation support facility

The Mississippi National Guard has AH-64 Apache and UH-72 Lakota military helicopters based at their facility located on the airport.

Statistics

Accidents and incidents 
On September 3, 2022, an Tupelo Aviation employee stole a 1987 Beech C90A plane from the airport and flew it above the Tupelo area, threatening to crash it into a nearby Walmart. After several hours, the plane landed safely in Ashland and the pilot was detained.

References

Further reading 

 Essential Air Service documents (Docket DOT-OST-2009-0160) from the U.S. Department of Transportation:
 Ninety-day notice (July 14, 2009): from Mesaba Aviation, Inc. of its intent to discontinue unsubsidized scheduled air service at the following communities, effective October 12, 2009: Paducah, KY; Alpena, MI; Muskegon, MI; Hancock, MI; Sault Ste. Marie, MI; International Falls, MN; Tupelo, MS and Eau Claire, WI.
 Essential Air Service documents (Docket DOT-OST-2009-0305) from the U.S. Department of Transportation:
 Memorandum (November 19, 2009): closing out docket DOT-2009-0160 and opening up eight new dockets for the various communities (Alpena, MI; Eau Claire, WI; Hancock/Houghton, MI; International Falls, MN; Muskegon, MI; Paducah, KY; Sault Ste. Marie, MI; Tupelo, MS).
 Order 2010-5-18 (May 13, 2010): setting final past-period subsidy rates for Mesaba Airlines, Inc., d/b/a Delta Connection, for its forced service at Alpena and Sault Ste. Marie, Michigan, International Falls, Minnesota, and Tupelo, Mississippi. Also selecting Mesaba to provide essential air service (EAS) at three of these four communities on a prospective basis. At the fourth community, Tupelo, we are tentatively selecting Mesaba to provide service based on a pro-rata application of the rate Mesaba agreed to which the staff applied to a reduced service level.
 Ninety Day Notice (July 15, 2011): from MESABA AVIATION, INC. and PINNACLE AIRLINES, INC. of termination of service at Tupelo, MS.
 Order 2011-9-5 (September 13, 2011): prohibiting suspension of service and requesting proposals
 Order 2012-5-17 (May 22, 2012): selecting Silver Airways, formerly Gulfstream International Airways, to provide Essential Air Service (EAS) at Muscle Shoals, Alabama, Greenville, Laurel/Hattiesburg, and Tupelo, Mississippi, and Greenbrier/White Sulphur Springs, West Virginia (Lewisburg), using 34-passenger Saab 340 aircraft, for a combined annual subsidy of $16,098,538. Tupelo will receive 18 weekly round trips over a Greenville-Tupelo-Atlanta routing
 Order 2012-6-3 (June 6, 2012): extending the Essential Air Service obligation of the two wholly owned subsidiaries of Pinnacle Airlines Corporation – Mesaba Aviation, Inc. and Pinnacle Airlines, d/b/a Delta Connection at the eight communities listed below (Muscle Shoals, AL; Alpena, MI; Iron Mountain/Kingsford, MI; Brainerd, MN; International Falls, MN; Greenville, MS; Laurel/Hattiesburg, MS; Tupelo, MS) for 30 days, through, July 9, 2012.
 Notice of Intent (April 9, 2014): of Silver Airways Corp. ... to discontinue subsidized scheduled air service between Atlanta, Georgia (ATL) and each of Muscle Shoals, Alabama (MSL), Greenville, Mississippi (GLH), Laurel/Hattiesburg, Mississippi (PIB), and Tupelo, Mississippi (TUP). Silver Airways intends to discontinue this service on July 8, 2014 or such earlier date as permitted by the Department in any final order terminating the eligibility of any of these communities under the essential air service (EAS) program.
 Order 2014-4-24 (April 22, 2014): prohibits Silver Airways Corp., from terminating service at Muscle Shoals, Alabama, Greenville, Laurel/Hattiesburg, Meridian, and Tupelo, Mississippi, for 30 days beyond the end of the air carrier's 90-day notice period, i.e. August 7, 2014. We are also requesting proposals from air carriers interested in providing Essential Air Service (EAS) at Muscle Shoals, Greenville, Laurel/Hattiesburg, Meridian, and/or Tupelo.

External links
 Tupelo Regional Airport, official site
 Aerial image as of March 1996 from USGS The National Map
 
 
 

Airports in Mississippi
Essential Air Service
Tupelo, Mississippi
Buildings and structures in Lee County, Mississippi
Transportation in Lee County, Mississippi